Here It Comes Again may refer to:

 "Here It Comes Again" (The Fortunes song)
 "Here It Comes Again" (Melanie C song)
 "Here It Comes Again", a song by Korn on the album Take a Look in the Mirror
 "Here It Comes Again", a song by The Jesus and Mary Chain on their Darklands E.P. release

See also
 Here It Comes (disambiguation)